Ndubuisi Obi is an Anglican bishop in Nigeria: since 2019 he has been the Bishop of Nnewi.

He was elected Bishop of Nnewi to succeed Godwin Okpala on 23 August 2019 at St. Peter's Chapel, Ibru International Ecumenical Centre, Agbarha Otor, Delta State.

Notes

Living people
Anglican bishops of Nnewi
21st-century Anglican bishops in Nigeria
Year of birth missing (living people)